Mavikent, Kumluca is a village in the District of Kumluca. Many turtles in the area that lay their eggs on the beaches there.

Antalya Province, Turkey.

References

Villages in Kumluca District